"Show Me How to Live" is a song by American rock band Audioslave. It was released in June 2003 as the third single from their first album, Audioslave released in 2003. It peaked at number 67 on the Billboard Hot 100 singles chart, number 2 on the Mainstream Rock Tracks and number 4 in the Modern Rock Tracks.

Produced by Rick Rubin, the song contains heavy guitar and drum riffs and a solo broken up with a phasing, fluttering effect by Tom Morello. Chris Cornell achieves an unusual effect by repeatedly striking his throat with the side of his hand while changing pitch.

Composition
The song is played at a tempo of roughly 90 BPM and contains heavy guitar and drum riffs and a solo broken up with a phasing, fluttering effect by Tom Morello, achieved by using a combination of tremolo picking the high E-string, using his trademark Dunlop Cry Baby wah pedal and a ring modulator effect. Chris Cornell achieves an unusual effect by repeatedly striking his throat with the side of his hand while changing pitch.

Track listing
 "Show Me How to Live"
 "Super Stupid" (Funkadelic cover) (Live BBC Radio 1 Session).
 "Like a Stone" (Live BBC Radio 1 Session).
 "Gasoline" (Live BBC Radio 1 Session).

7" single
 "Show Me How to Live"
 "Super Stupid" (Funkadelic cover) (Live BBC Radio 1 Session).

Music video
The music video for the song is made of clips from the 1971 film Vanishing Point in which a white 1970 Dodge Challenger driven by a drug addict from Denver to San Francisco is involved in several car chases with police cars and motorcycles, and a Jaguar E-Type. The clips of a radio DJ (played by Cleavon Little) singing and dancing to 1970 music have been synchronized to the Audioslave song. Other parts have been remade with the band members, in the car driven by the lead singer Chris Cornell, and playing in front of a small audience in the Nevada desert. The movie, and the video, ends with the muscle car deliberately crashing into a bulldozer road block set up by police. Thus, the video was banned from MTV.

Two Challengers were used during the filming of the video, one of which was given away in a contest put on by the band. Cornell and the band's drummer, Brad Wilk, autographed the inside of the trunk of this car. The video was filmed in Los Angeles, California, and was produced by Allan Wachs and directed by AV Club.

Personnel
Tim Commerford – bass guitar
Chris Cornell – lead vocals
Tom Morello – guitar
Brad Wilk – drums
Rick Rubin – producer

Charts

References

External links

Audioslave songs
2003 singles
Song recordings produced by Rick Rubin
Songs written by Chris Cornell
2002 songs
Epic Records singles